Stephen John Shepherd (born 1 August 1973) is an English actor. He is known for his portrayals of Jo in the TV drama This Life and Michael Moon in the soap opera EastEnders from 2010 to 2013.

Personal life
Shepherd was born in London and attended St Bonaventure's Catholic School where he first discovered an interest in acting. His mother is of English and Burmese ancestry, and his father is of English and Chinese ancestry. He lives in west London with his wife Anna Wilson-Jones and their three children.

Career
Shepherd's first well-known role was in 1996 in This Life. He remained in the role for two series (1996–1997). Other credits include The Best Man (2005), The One That Got Away (1996), Maisie Raine (1998), Virtual Sexuality (1999), G:MT - Greenwich Mean Time (1999),  Forgive and Forget (2000), Star Wars: Episode II – Attack of the Clones (2002), Boudica (2003), Layer Cake (2004), The Last Chancers (2004), Too Much Too Young (2005), and Dalziel and Pascoe. He played Paul in Channel 4's Plus One (2007) and appeared in Piaf at the Donmar Warehouse until 20 September 2008.

Shepherd appeared in BBC Three sitcom Lunch Monkeys as Charlie Brierson. On 17 January 2010, he appeared in the second episode of the second series of Being Human as Carl, a gay vampire. In 2011 he played the role of child abductor Max "Bag Man" Harding in the BBC series Waking the Dead.

In July 2010, Shepherd's casting as Michael Moon, the cousin of Alfie Moon, in EastEnders was announced. He made his first appearance on 1 October 2010. In May 2011, Shepherd was nominated in the Best Soap Newcomer category at the 2011 TV Choice Awards for his portrayal of Michael. In March 2013, Shepherd announced that he would be leaving EastEnders later that year. Shepherd's final storyline surrounded Michael's plan to murder his wife Janine Butcher. Michael's last episode was on 1 November 2013, when he was killed by Janine. Shepherd left the show to explore new roles.

Filmography

References

External links
 

1973 births
British male actors of Asian descent
British male actors of Chinese descent
English male film actors
English male stage actors
English male television actors
English people of Burmese descent
English people of Chinese descent
People from Plaistow, Newham
People educated at St Bonaventure's Catholic School
Living people